The Roman Catholic Archdiocese of Maputo is the Metropolitan See for the Ecclesiastical province of Maputo in Mozambique.

History
 21 January 1612: Established as a prelature nullius from the Diocese of Goa 
 1783: Promoted as Territorial Prelature of Mozambique
 4 September 1940: Promoted as Archdiocese of Lourenço Marques 
 18 September 1976: Renamed Archdiocese of Maputo

Cathedral
The seat of the archbishop is the Cathedral of Our Lady of the Immaculate Conception (Catedral Metropolitana de Nossa Senhora da Conceição) in Maputo.

Bishops

Ordinaries

Prelates Nullius of Mozambique 
 Domingos Torrado, O.S.A. (1612), auxiliary bishop of Goa, named by Pope Paul VI but died in Goa before leaving for Africa 
...

Prelates of Mozambique 
 Amaro José de São Tomás, OP (18 July 1783 – 18 July 1801)
 Vasco José a Domina Nostra de Bona Morte Lobo, CRSA (26 June 1805 – 17 December 1811)
 Joaquim de Nossa Senhora de Nazareth Oliveira e Abreu, OFM Ref (17 December 1811 – 23 August 1819), appointed Bishop of São Luís do Maranhão, Brazil
 Bartholomeu de Martyribus Maya, OCD (10 November 1819 – 1828)
 Antonio Tomas da Silva Leitão e Castro (30 January 1883 – 27 March 1884), appointed Bishop of Angola e Congo, Angola
 Henrique José Reed da Silva (27 March 1884 – 14 March 1887), appointed Bishop of São Tomé of Meliapore, India
 Antonio Dias Ferreira (14 March 1887 – 1 June 1891), appointed Bishop of Angola e Congo, Angola
 António José de Sousa Barroso (12 February 1891 – 11 October 1897), appointed Bishop of São Tomé of Meliapore, India
 Sebastião José Pereira (16 November 1897 – 23 July 1900)
 Antonio José Gomes Cardoso (Apostolic administrator; 17 December 1900 – 23 July 1901)
 António Moutinho (21 August 1901 – 14 November 1904), appointed Bishop of Santiago de Cabo Verde, Cape Verde 
 Francisco Ferreira da Silva (14 November 1904 – 8 May 1920)
 Joaquim Rafael Maria d’Assunçâo Pitinho, OFM (16 December 1920 – 15 November 1935), appointed Bishop of Santiago de Cabo Verde, Cape Verde
 Teodósio de Gouveia (18 May 1936 – 4 September 1940 see below); future Cardinal

Archbishops of Maputo 
Until 1976, the Archbishop of Maputo was titled the Archbishop of Lourenço Marques.
 Teodósio de Gouveia (see above 4 September 1940 – 6 February 1962) (Cardinal in 1946)
 Custódio Alvim Pereira (3 August 1962 – 26 August 1974)
 Alexandre José Maria dos Santos, OFM (23 December 1974 – 22 February 2003) (Cardinal in 1988)
 Francisco Chimoio, OFM Cap (since 22 February 2003)

Auxiliary Bishops
António Juliasse Ferreira Sandramo (2018-)
João Carlos Hatoa Nunes (2011-2017), appointed Bishop of Chimoio
Adriano Langa, O.F.M. (1997-2005), appointed Coadjutor Bishop of Inhambane
Custódio Alvim Pereira (1958-1962), appointed Archbishop here

Other priests of this diocese who became bishops
Ernesto Maguengue, appointed Bishop of Pemba in 2004
Lucio Andrice Muandula, appointed Bishop of Xai-Xai in 2004

Suffragan dioceses
 Inhambane
 Xai-Xai

See also
Catholic Church in Mozambique

Notes

References
 GCatholic.org

Maputo
1612 establishments in the Portuguese Empire
A